The 30th Senate District of Wisconsin is one of 33 districts in the Wisconsin State Senate.  Located in northeast Wisconsin, the district comprises parts of central Brown County, eastern Oconto County, and southeast Marinette County.  It includes most of the city of Green Bay, the northern half of the city of De Pere, and the cities of Marinette and Oconto.

Current elected officials
Eric Wimberger is the senator representing the 30th district. He was first elected to the senate in the 2020 general election.

Each Wisconsin State Senate district is composed of three Wisconsin State Assembly districts.  The 30th Senate district comprises the 88th, 89th, and 90th Assembly districts.  The current representatives of those districts are:
 Assembly District 88: John Macco (R–Ledgeview)
 Assembly District 89: Elijah Behnke (R–Pensaukee)
 Assembly District 90: Kristina Shelton (D–Green Bay)

The district is located entirely within Wisconsin's 8th congressional district, which is represented by U.S. Representative Mike Gallagher.

Past senators
Previous senators from the district include:

Note: the boundaries of districts have changed repeatedly over history. Previous politicians of a specific numbered district have represented a completely different geographic area, due to redistricting.

References

External links
District Website

Wisconsin State Senate districts
Brown County, Wisconsin
Shawano County, Wisconsin
Oconto County, Wisconsin
Marinette County, Wisconsin
1856 establishments in Wisconsin